The 1904–05 Northern Rugby Football Union season was the tenth season of rugby league football.

Season summary

Oldham won their first Division One Championship whilst Warrington won the Challenge Cup.

Holbeck and South Shields dropped out, reducing the competition to 15 teams.

Birkenhead resigned after 4 games, the results of which were struck out of the table. They lost all four games, conceding 93 points and scoring none.

On 4 March 1905, a record 11 tries were scored by George West (Hull Kingston Rovers) v Brookland Rovers in the Northern Union Challenge Cup. In this same match the record for most points in a match, 53 (11t, 10g) by George West (Hull Kingston Rovers) was recorded.

There was no county league competition this season.

At the end of the season, all division one and division two clubs. except Lancaster, were elected to the new single top division, the NRFU Championship.

Notable events

 At the start of this season, the Northern Union changed its rules to allow clubs to have full-time players paid by the clubs, thus making it fully professional.

Division One

Division two

Challenge Cup

Warrington  beat Hull Kingston Rovers 6-0 in the final at Leeds before a crowd of 19,638 to win the Cup at their third attempt in a final.

References

External links
 1904-05 Rugby Football League season at wigan.rlfans.com

1904 in English rugby league
1905 in English rugby league
Northern Rugby Football Union seasons